Lonny is a monthly online magazine, launched in October 2009, that focuses on lifestyle and home decor.
The magazine's name is a portmanteau of "London" and "NY", the hometowns of its two founders, designer Michelle Adams and photographer Patrick Cline. Lonny was acquired by Livingly Media in 2012. In 2013 Michelle Adams ended her tenure as editor-in-chief of the magazine. The same year Irene Edwards was appointed executive editor of the magazine. In 2015, Livingly Media was acquired by aufeminin.com, a subsidiary of Axel Springer. The magazine is based in Redwood City, California. On 12 December 2017, Axel Springer signs option agreement for the sale of its stake in aufeminin group to TF1 Télévision Française 1 S.A 

In 2022, TF1 sold Livingly Media to Recurrent.

References

External links

Monthly magazines published in the United States
Lifestyle magazines published in the United States
Online magazines published in the United States
Design magazines
Magazines established in 2009
Magazines published in the San Francisco Bay Area